The 1995–96 Connecticut Huskies men's basketball team represented the University of Connecticut in the 1995–96 collegiate men's basketball season. The Huskies completed the season with a 30–2 overall record. The Huskies were members of the Big East Conference where they finished with a 17–1 record and were the Regular Season Champions and the 1996 Big East men's basketball tournament champions. They made it to the Sweet Sixteen in the 1996 NCAA Division I men's basketball tournament, where they had a 2–1 record that was later vacated by the NCAA. The Huskies played their home games at Harry A. Gampel Pavilion in Storrs, Connecticut and the Hartford Civic Center in Hartford, Connecticut, and they were led by tenth-year head coach Jim Calhoun.

Schedule 

|-
!colspan=12 style=""| Regular Season

|-
!colspan=12 style=""| Big East tournament

|-
!colspan=12 style=""| NCAA tournament

Schedule Source:

Rankings

References 

UConn Huskies men's basketball seasons
Connecticut Huskies
Connecticut
1995 in sports in Connecticut
1996 in sports in Connecticut